Frank Anthony (25 September 1908 – 3 December 1993) was a leader of the Anglo-Indian community in India, and was until his death their nominated representative in the Parliament of India except 6th and 9th Lok Sabha. He served as the president of the All India Anglo-Indian Association.

He was also the founder of the Council for the Indian School Certificate Examinations (CISCE) which operates the ICSE board of Education in India.

Early life and education
Anthony was born in Jubbulpore (now "Jabalpur") on 25 September 1908. He studied at Nagpur University, and Inner Temple in London and became Bar-at-law.

Role in Constituent Assembly 
In 1942–46, he was a member of the Central Legislative Assembly, and later a member of the Constituent Assembly of India during 1946–50 and represented the Anglo-Indian community in assembly. He was also temporary vice president of Constituent Assembly & he was a part of the Advisory Committee and Sub-committee on Minorities.

Career
In 1942, Anthony was elected the president-in-chief of the community of the All India Anglo-Indian Association. He opposed the partition of India on the grounds that it would jeopardise the interests of the minority communities. Anthony criticized the pro-separatist All India Muslim League led by Muhammad Ali Jinnah, holding them to be responsible for the murderers that occurred during Direct Action Day and for spreading communal hatred. The All India Anglo-Indian Association saved the lives of both Hindus and Muslims during the rioting. When the future of India was being decided by British, Hindu and Muslim leaders, he presented the Anglo-Indian case to Mahatma Gandhi, Sardar Vallabhbhai Patel and Jawaharlal Nehru, and they agreed to make special provisions for the Anglo-Indians in the Indian Constitution. In particular, two seats were reserved for members of the Anglo-Indian community in the Lok Sabha (Lower House) of the Indian parliament, the only reserved seats in the House.  These seats were abolished in 2020 by the One Hundred and Fourth Amendment of the Constitution of India.

Anthony was a member of the Provisional Parliament during 195052. He was nominated to all Lok Sabha from the 1st till the 10th, except the 6th and 9th Lok Sabha.

After Anthony retired from practising as a lawyer, PM Nehru in 1952 asked him to go to Peshawar to defend Mehr Chand Khanna, the ex-finance minister of the North-West Frontier Province. In those days, no Hindu lawyer would go to Peshawar. Following Anthony's discussions with the chief minister, Khanna was released. In October 1946, he was one of India's delegates at the United Nations. In 1948 and 1957, he represented India at the Commonwealth Parliamentary Conference. In 1978, Anthony assisted the Nehru family when Indira Gandhi was arrested.

Anthony's greatest contribution was in the field of Anglo-Indian education. In 1947, he was elected chairman of the Inter-State Board of Anglo-Indian Education. He was also the Founder-Chairman of the All India Anglo-Indian Educational Trust which, today, owns and administers six schools named after him, including The Frank Anthony Public School, New Delhi, The Frank Anthony Public School, Bengaluru, The Frank Anthony Public School, Kolkata and three Frank Anthony Junior Schools in the cities of Bangalore, Kolkata and Delhi. These schools took as inspiration the model of the long-establish English public school.

Anthony was also the chairman of the ICSE Council.

Frank Anthony was critical of Muhammad Ali Jinnah and his ideology of separatism, holding Jinnah and pro-separatist All India Muslim League responsible for the murders of Direct Action Day on 16 August 1946:

Frank Anthony charged the pro-separatist All India Muslim League with being "born in hatred" and being "responsible for an inevitable cycle of violence."

See also
The Frank Anthony Memorial All-India Inter-School Debate

References 

1908 births
Anglo-Indian people
Madhya Pradesh politicians
1993 deaths
Educators from Madhya Pradesh
Founders of Indian schools and colleges
Members of the Constituent Assembly of India
People from Jabalpur
Nominated members of the Lok Sabha
India MPs 1952–1957
India MPs 1957–1962
India MPs 1962–1967
India MPs 1967–1970
India MPs 1971–1977
India MPs 1980–1984
India MPs 1984–1989
India MPs 1991–1996
Rashtrasant Tukadoji Maharaj Nagpur University alumni
20th-century Indian lawyers
20th-century Indian educational theorists